Cyril Alec "Bob" Stiles (10 October 1904 – 5 March 1985) was a New Zealand rower. He won a Silver medal at the 1932 Summer Olympics in Los Angeles in the coxless pairs with partner Rangi Thompson. He also won a Bronze medal at the 1938 British Empire Games in Sydney in the eights.

A Christchurch street is named after Stiles. Stiles Place runs off another street named after a New Zealand rower; that is Arnst Place named after Richard Arnst. Both are near that part of the Avon River used by local rowers known as Kerr's Reach.

References

1904 births
1985 deaths
New Zealand male rowers
Olympic rowers of New Zealand
Olympic silver medalists for New Zealand
Rowers at the 1932 Summer Olympics
Rowers at the 1938 British Empire Games
Commonwealth Games bronze medallists for New Zealand
Olympic medalists in rowing
Medalists at the 1932 Summer Olympics
Commonwealth Games medallists in rowing
Medallists at the 1938 British Empire Games